Rostock railway station may refer to:

 Rostock Hauptbahnhof railway station, the main railway station in the German city of Rostock
 Rostock-Kassebohm railway station, a railway station in the German city of Rostock
 Rostock Thierfelder Straße railway station, a railway station in the German city of Rostock
 Rostock railway station (Jungfraubahn), a former railway station on the Jungfraubahn in Switzerland